Moravský Žižkov is a municipality and village in Břeclav District in the South Moravian Region of the Czech Republic. It has about 1,500 inhabitants.

History
Founded in 1731, it is one of the youngest communities of the South Moravian Region. It was a part of Velké Bílovice until 1792, when it became a sovereign municipality.

Demographics

Economy
In land, its register pertains big quantity of vineyards, arable land and fruit trees.

References

External links

 

Villages in Břeclav District
Moravian Slovakia